Thomas Lawley may refer to

Thomas Lawley (MP died 1559), MP for Much Wenlock
Thomas Lawley (MP died 1621), MP for Much Wenlock (UK Parliament constituency)
Sir Thomas Lawley, 1st Baronet (died 1646), MP for Much Wenlock
Sir Thomas Lawley, 3rd Baronet (c.1650–1729), MP for Much Wenlock

See also
Lawley (surname)